David Probert (born 1988) is a Welsh jockey who was joint British flat racing Champion Apprentice in 2008.

Background

Probert was born in Bargoed, Wales, attended Ysgol Gyfun Cwm Rhymni Welsh language school, and grew up competing in pony racing and Gymkhana in and around Wales. He attended the British Racing School in Newmarket.

Riding career
Since leaving the school, he has ridden for Andrew Balding, and has had Ian Balding as a mentor, although his first winner was Mountain Pass for John Lewis Llewellyn in 2007. In 2008, he won the British flat racing Champion Apprentice title jointly with William Buick.

In 2012, he won the Investec Derby Trial on Goldoni. That same year, he won his first group race, the Group 2 Oettingen-Rennen on what he called "the best horse I've ever ridden", Highland Knight. 
The following year, he picked up the Group 3 Darley Stakes on the same horse.

June 2014 brought a number of milestones. He became the youngest Welshman to ride in the Derby, finishing eleventh on Impulsive Moment. He got his first Royal Ascot winner came in the Britannia Stakes on the Balding-trained Born in Bombay Later that month, on 28 June, he recorded his first four-timer at Brighton, with combined odds of 8031/1 - Assertive Agent for Tony Carroll in the first, Curious Fox for Anthony Carson in the 2nd, Fashion Parade for Charlie Hills in the 3rd, Noverre to Go for Ron Harris in the 4th. Later in the year, he won the Oettingen-Rennen again for Balding on Here Comes When

In 2015, he won the Group 3 Sandown Classic Trial on Master Apprentice and the Doonside Cup on Scottish.

Then in 2016, he won the Stewards Cup at Goodwood, three year old filly Dancing Star, only the second filly to do so since Lochsong, a horse to which she was related.

References 

http://www.geegeez.co.uk/a-chat-with-david-probert/

1988 births
Living people
Welsh jockeys
British Champion apprentice jockeys